The H. P. Boult House is a historic house located at 1123 South 2nd Street in Springfield, Illinois. The house, which was built in 1889, has a Queen Anne design with Eastlake ornamentation. The two-story wooden house has horizontal siding and X-shaped bracing. The front porch features a gable with a carved pediment, projecting carved panels, and a latticed base. A tower rises above the front porch; the other half of the front facade is dominated by a gable. The house's interior features a curved cherry staircase, decorative woodwork throughout, and a painted slate fireplace.

The house was added to the National Register of Historic Places on June 3, 1982.

References

Houses on the National Register of Historic Places in Illinois
Queen Anne architecture in Illinois
Houses completed in 1889
National Register of Historic Places in Springfield, Illinois
Houses in Springfield, Illinois